Peel High School is a government-funded co-educational dual modality partially academically selective and comprehensive secondary day school, located in Tamworth, a city in the northwest region of New South Wales, Australia.

Established in 1976, the school enrolled 720 students in 2018, from Year 7 to Year 12, of whom 38 percent identified as Indigenous Australians and six percent were from a language background other than English. The school is operated by the NSW Department of Education; and prepares students for the School Certificate (Year 10), and the NSW Higher School Certificate (Year 12). The principal is Rodney Jones.

Peel High School has an educational focus on technology.

Overview 
Established in 1976, Peel High School was named after Sir Robert Peel, a British politician at the time of the discovery of the Tamworth region, by British settlers in Australia. On the first of February 1977, Peel High School occupied its temporary premises at the rear of Hillvue Public School in demountable buildings while permanent buildings were being constructed at the Gunnedah road site.

The school provides a broad curriculum, with links to the community, parents, Technical and Further Education (TAFE), local businesses and local government schools. It has three special needs classes, Aboriginal education, and is responsible for the offsite annex, Tamworth Tutorial Centre, which caters for students from local schools with conduct disorders.

Peel High School has had success over many years with the breeding of Suffolk sheep and Angus cattle along with poultry breeding and showing. The school is a registered breeder of Suffolk sheep, and has won first prizes at the Sydney Royal Easter Show including Grand Champion Ram, Grand Champion Ewe, Champion Schools Exhibit and most successful school.

Principals 
The following individuals have served as principal of Peel High School:

See also

 List of government schools in New South Wales
 List of selective high schools in New South Wales
 Selective school (New South Wales)
 Schools in Tamworth, New South Wales
 Education in Australia

References

External links
 

Buildings and structures in Tamworth, New South Wales
Public high schools in New South Wales
Selective schools in New South Wales
Educational institutions established in 1976
1976 establishments in Australia